Ill Behaviour is a British comedy-drama television series first broadcast in 2017.

Plot
Charlie has been diagnosed with a readily treated cancer, Hodgkin lymphoma, but decides to try alternative therapies such as coffee enemas and homeopathy.

His friends, Tess and recently divorced Joel, lock him in a cellar and inject him with chemotherapy drugs against his will. They are helped by a deregistered American doctor, Nadia. Tess and Joel take desperate measures to cover up their scheme, prevent Charlie escaping, and mislead his wife, Kira.

Production and cast
The series was commissioned by BBC3, written by Sam Bain, directed by Steve Bendelack, and produced by Fudge Park Productions.

Main cast
 Chris Geere as Joel
 Tom Riley as Charlie
 Jessica Regan as Tess
 Lizzy Caplan as Nadia
 Christina Chong as Kira

Broadcast
Ill Behaviour was first broadcast on BBC2 on 20 August 2017 following its 22 July release on iPlayer. It aired on Showtime in the US in November 2017.
It has been aired both as six separate episodes and as three hour-long episodes.

Reception
Ill Behaviour has received mostly middling reviews from critics,  according to aggregator websites, scoring 55 on Metacritic and 67 per cent on Rotten Tomatoes as of January 2020.

References

External links
 
 

2017 British television series debuts
2017 British television series endings
2010s British comedy television series
English-language television shows
Hodgkin lymphoma
Television shows set in Bristol
Television shows set in England